The 2003 Africa Cup (officially called at those time "Africa Top Nive") was the fourth edition of highest level rugby union tournament in Africa
Nine teams were admitted, but Tunisia withdrew. The final was played in 2004, due to the participation of Namibia in the 2003 Rugby World Cup tournament.
The teams were divided in three pools, with the winner of the pool and the better second admitted to the semifinals. A second division was also played

Division 1 (Africa Cup)

Regional pools

Pool A

Pool 2

Pool 3

Knockout stage

Semifinals

Final

Division 2

References and notes 

2003
2003 rugby union tournaments for national teams
2003 in African rugby union